Special is the fourth studio album by American singer and rapper Lizzo, released by Nice Life and Atlantic Records on July 15, 2022. It was preceded by the lead single "About Damn Time", released on April 14, 2022, which reached number one on the Billboard Hot 100, and the top ten in twelve other countries.

Special, has been described by critics as a pop, funk, disco, hip hop and R&B album. It received positive reviews from music critics. The album peaked at number two on the US Billboard 200 chart, becoming, at the time, the highest-charting album by a female artist in 2022, as well as the largest week by units earned, among all albums released by women in 2022. It reached the top ten on the UK, Australian, Canadian, Hungary, and New Zealand album charts.

Background
Lizzo released her third studio album and major-label debut studio album, Cuz I Love You, on April 19, 2019. The album was met with critical acclaim and peaked at number four on the Billboard 200 chart. The album was nominated for Album of the Year at the 62nd Annual Grammy Awards, contributing to Lizzo receiving the most nominations at the ceremony. The album also won the award for Best Urban Contemporary Album.

In October 2020, Lizzo announced that her fourth studio album was nearing completion, saying she had "a few more songs to write". In January 2021, American singer SZA confirmed to have heard new material from Lizzo. In August 2021, Lizzo announced "Rumors", her first song after two years, which was released on August 13. The standalone single features American rapper, singer, and songwriter Cardi B.

During her keynote speech at the South by Southwest festival in March 2022, Lizzo announced that her album was finished, saying "It’s done so it’s coming very very soon…and it’s good. I worked real hard on it, so it better be good."

Production and recording 
Recording for "Special" began in 2018, but the tracks that made up the album only started to be recorded in September 2021 and was finished by March 2022.

In an interview with Zane Lowe for Apple Music 1 in April 2022, Lizzo explained that the album was originally titled In Case Nobody Told You until Max Martin helped her "restructure" the hook of the song "Special", which she then changed the title of the album to.

In another interview with Zane Lowe on Apple Music 1 in July 2022, Lizzo talked about the origins of the track "Coldplay", with Coldplay lead singer Chris Martin briefly appearing in the interview as well. The track features a monologue by Lizzo where she talks about a recent vacation in which she "was with somebody, and I was just looking at the stars. And I was with him, and I was singing ["Yellow"]."

Promotion 
On March 21, 2022, Lizzo previewed the single "About Damn Time" on The Late Late Show with James Corden, with a release date of April 14. Shortly after the release of the song and its accompanying music video, Lizzo formally announced Special, with a release date of July 15.

On July 6, Lizzo revealed the tracklist of Special on her Instagram account by showing the back cover of its vinyl packaging.

Singles 
"About Damn Time" was released on April 14, 2022, as the lead single of the album. The song was a commercial success peaking at the top of The Billboard Hot 100 in the US as well as reaching top 3 in 7 other countries.

On July 18, 2022 "2 Be Loved (Am I Ready)" was released to Italian radio as the album's second single. In the United States the song impacted hot adult contemporary radio on August 1, 2022 and contemporary hit radio, as well as rhythmic contemporary radio on August 2, 2022. 

The title track was released on January 13, 2023 as the album's third single. While "Special" was rumored to have a remix featuring American singer SZA dating back to November 2022, it was finally confirmed by Lizzo on her social media accounts when she announced the official remix. The "Special" Remix featuring SZA was released on February 9, 2023.

Promotional singles 
"Grrrls" was released on June 10, 2022, as the album's first promotional single.

Tour

On April 25, 2022, Lizzo announced a full arena tour in support of the album, starting on September 23, 2022, in Sunrise, Florida and ending on June 2, 2023, in Thousand Palms, California. Latto opened for the tour.

Critical reception

Reviews

Special received generally positive reviews from music critics upon its initial release. At Metacritic, which assigns a normalized rating out of 100 to reviews from mainstream critics, the album has an average score of 78, based on 16 reviews, indicating "generally favorable reviews".

Writing for Evening Standard David Smyth states that "This time she'll sweep an older generation into her gang too. Many of the biggest tunes channel Seventies disco and Eighties synthpop" and added "It's clear she isn’t an outsider any more. This is her world, and we're lucky to live in it." In an article for The Independent, reviewer Helen Brown pointed that Special is overflowing with love and gratitude to friends, family, lovers and fans and added that [Lizzo's] rap flow has a terrific tensile strength and said that when singing, she delivers as both a belter and a breathy balladeer. Special is good as hell." NME contributor Nick Levine gave the album four out of five stars, observing that "Lizzo's overwhelmingly positive message, Special is sometimes a bit cheesy," before concluding that "Lizzo knows exactly who she is as an artist and what she wants to achieve: she's the bad bitch with an incredible talent for making people feel good". In a more mixed reception of the album, Sam Franzini of The Line of Best Fit believed that for "most songs on Special, there is a rawer, more real iteration somewhere else in Lizzo’s catalog," and that having the "glossiest pop sheen steamrolled over them, erasing any wrinkles or mishaps" removed "the exact thing that made [Lizzo's songs] endearing to begin with." PopMatters published two contrasting reviews of the album, with John Amen scoring the album 7/10 and commenting that "Special is as much a celebration of the Twitter, Instagram, and Facebook cosmos as it is an in-person, post-Covid bacchanal." while Nick Malone scored the album 4/10 and wrote that "Special is such a disappointment because you can hear the better album Lizzo is capable of making."

Controversy over word choice
The song "Grrrls" earned controversy for its use of the word "spaz" in its lyrics "I'mma spaz / I'm about to knock somebody out". Disability advocates viewed the use of the term "spaz" as an offensive ableist slur and called for Lizzo to remove the song. Some internet users claimed that "spaz" is used differently in African-American Vernacular English and is synonymous with "freaking out," but disability organizations in the UK and the US have criticized its use. Shortly afterwards, Lizzo issued an apology and released an updated version of the song, stating, "I never want to promote derogatory language." The updated song lyrics replace "I'mma spaz" with "Hold me back".

Commercial performance
In the United States, Special debuted at number two on the US Billboard 200 chart, with 69,000 equivalent album units sold in its first week, becoming Lizzo's highest-charting album to date. It was the highest charting album by a female artist in 2022, as well as the largest week by units earned, among all albums released by women in 2022 until it was surpassed by Beyoncé's Renaissance and later by Taylor Swift's Midnights.

Track listing

Notes
  signifies an additional producer
  signifies a co-producer
 "About Damn Time" samples the song "Hey DJ" performed by The World's Famous Supreme Team, as written by Malcolm McLaren, Ronald Larkins, Larry Price and Stephen Hague.
 "Grrrls" samples the song "Girls" performed by Beastie Boys, as written by Beastie Boys and Rick Rubin.
 "I Love You Bitch" samples the song "I Hate You Bitch" performed by Z-Ro, as written by Z-Ro and Mike Dean.
 "Break Up Twice" interpolates the song "Doo Wop (That Thing)", as written and performed by Lauryn Hill.
 "Naked" samples the song "Summer Madness" written and performed by Kool & The Gang.
 "Coldplay" samples the song "Yellow" performed by Coldplay, as written by Chris Martin, Guy Berryman, Jonny Buckland, and Will Champion.
 "Coldplay" samples the song "Sudden Death" performed and written by Quelle Chris & Chris Keys.

Personnel

Musicians

 Lizzo – vocals (all tracks), flute (track 2)
 Phoelix – bass, programming (1)
 Thomas Pridgen – drums (1, 8)
 Nate Mercereau – electric guitar (1, 2, 8, 9, 11); acoustic guitar, bass, drums, piano (11)
 Lemar Guillary – horns arrangement, trombone (1, 6, 8)
 Ricky Reed – programming (1, 2, 6, 8, 9, 12), bass (2, 6, 8); additional vocals, horns arrangement, glockenspiel, guitar, synthesizer (2); instrumentation, keyboards (8, 9)
 Michael Cordone – trumpet (1, 2, 6, 8)
 Blake Slatkin – programming (2, 3), additional vocals (2); instrumentation, keyboards (3)
 Chawntá Van – additional vocals (2)
 Doshiniq Green – additional vocals (2)
 Myke Wright – additional vocals (2)
 Shelbeniece Swain – additional vocals (2)
 Victor Indrizzo – drums, percussion (2, 8)
 Jesse McGinty – saxophone, trombone (2)
 Terrace Martin – vocoder (2)
 Benny Blanco – instrumentation, keyboards, programming, vocals (3)
 Ilya – instrumentation (3), programming (3, 4); arrangement, background vocals, bass, drums, guitar (4); additional programming (6)
 Chris Keys - Instrumentation (12)
 Max Martin – instrumentation (3, 6), programming (3, 4, 6); arrangement, background vocals, bass, drums, guitar (4)
 Rickard Göransson – bass, guitar (4)
 Peter Carlsson – drums, guitar (4)
 Pop Wansel – instrumentation, programming (3, 6, 8, 9); keyboards (6, 8, 9)
 Johan Carlsson – organ, piano (4)
 Jasper Harris – piano (5)
 Daoud – guitar (6, 9); instrumentation, keyboards, piano, programming, Rhodes solo, saxophone (6)
 Ian Kirkpatrick – instrumentation, keyboards, programming (6, 8, 9)
 Donald Hayes – saxophone (6, 8)
 Nick Movshon – bass (7)
 Larry Gold – conductor, string arrangement (7)
 Tommy Brenneck – guitar (7)
 Leon Michels – keyboards (7)
 Mark Ronson – keyboards, string arrangement (7)
 Ian Hendrickson-Smith – saxophone (7)
 Raymond J. Mason – trombone (7)
 Dave Guy – trumpet (7)
 Jonathan Kim – viola (7)
 Yoshihiko Nakano – viola (7)
 Blake Espy – violin (7)
 Chris Jusell – violin (7)
 Emma Kummrow – violin (7)
 Gared Crawford – violin (7)
 Luigi Mazzocchi – violin (7)
 Natasha Colkett – violin (7)
 Jerry Hey – horns arrangement (10)
 Jordan Johnson – instrumentation, keyboards, programming (10)
 Stefan Johnson – instrumentation, programming (10)
 Michael Pollack – keyboards (10)
 Dan Higgins – saxophone (10)
 Andy Martin – trombone (10)
 Wayne Bergeron – trumpet (10)
 Kid Harpoon – drum programming, Mellotron, pianosynthesizer (11)
 Quelle Chris – additional vocals (12)
 Jon Kubis – string arrangement (12)
 Ray Chew – string arrangement (12)
 Adrianne Woods – cello (12)
 Ryan Cross – cello (12)
 Chris Woods – viola (12)
 Jarvis Benson – viola (12)
 Jonah Sirota – viola (12)
 Leah Katz – viola (12)
 Charlie Bisharat – violin (12)
 Daphne Chen – violin (12)
 Jenny Takamatsu – violin (12)
 Marissa Kuney – violin (12)
 Melissa Reiner – violin (12)
 Radu Pieptea – violin (12)
 Richard Adkins – violin (12)
 Songa Lee – violin (12)

Technical

 Michelle Mancini – mastering
 Manny Marroquin – mixing (1, 2, 7–12)
 Serban Ghenea – mixing (3–6)
 Ricky Reed – mixing (7)
 Bill Malina – engineering (1, 2, 6, 8, 12)
 Patrick Kehrier – engineering (1–9, 12), engineering assistance (10, 11)
 Benny Blanco – engineering (3)
 Ilya – engineering (3)
 Damien Lewis – engineering (6, 8, 9)
 Ian Kirkpatrick – engineering (6, 8, 9)
 Jacob Ferguson – engineering (7)
 Jeff Chestek – engineering (7)
 Jens Jungkurth – engineering (7)
 Stefan Johnson – engineering (10)
 Jeremy Hatcher – engineering (11)
 Bryce Bordone – mix engineering (6), mixing assistance (3–5)
 Andrew Hey – horns engineering (10)
 Anthony Vilchis – mixing assistance (1, 2, 7–12)
 Trey Station – mixing assistance (1, 2, 7–12)
 Zach Pereyra – mixing assistance (1, 2, 7–12)
 Chad Gordon – engineering assistance (1)
 James Kirk – engineering assistance (2)
 Piéce Eatah – engineering assistance (2)
 Trey Pearce – engineering assistance (2)
 Nate Ramer – engineering assistance (11)
 Tom Peltier – engineering assistance (11)
 Ira Grylack – engineering assistance (12)

Charts

Weekly charts

Year-end charts

Certifications

Release history

References

2022 albums
Atlantic Records albums
Lizzo albums
Albums produced by Ricky Reed
Albums produced by Max Martin
Albums produced by Ilya Salmanzadeh
Albums produced by Benny Blanco
Obscenity controversies in music